The first lord of the Treasury is the head of the Lords Commissioners of the Treasury exercising the ancient office of Lord High Treasurer in the United Kingdom, and is by convention also the prime minister. This office is not equivalent to the usual position of the "treasurer" in other governments; the closer equivalent of a treasurer in the United Kingdom is Chancellor of the Exchequer, who is the second lord of the Treasury.

Lords of the Treasury
As of the beginning of the 17th century, the running of the Treasury was frequently entrusted to a commission, rather than to a single individual. Since 1714, it has permanently been in commission. The commissioners have always since that date been referred to as Lords Commissioners of the Treasury, and adopted ordinal numbers to describe their seniority. Eventually in the middle of the same century, the first lord of the Treasury came to be seen as the natural head of the overall ministry running the country, and, as of the time of Robert Walpole (Whig), began to be known, unofficially, as the prime minister.

The term prime minister was initially, but decreasingly, used as a term of derogation; it was first used officially in a royal warrant only in 1905. William Pitt the Younger said the prime minister "ought to be the person at the head of the finances"—though Pitt also served as chancellor of the exchequer for the entirety of his time as prime minister, so his linkage of the finance portfolio to the premiership was wider than merely proposing the occupation of the first lordship by the prime minister.

Prior to 1841 the first lord of the Treasury also held the office of chancellor of the exchequer unless he was a peer and thus barred from that office; in this case, the second lord of the Treasury usually served as chancellor. As of 1841, the chancellor has always been second lord of the Treasury when he was not also prime minister. By convention, the other Lords Commissioners of the Treasury are also Government Whips in the House of Commons.

Official residence

10 Downing Street is the official residence of the first lord of the Treasury, not the office of prime minister. Chequers, a country house in Buckinghamshire, is the official country residence of the prime minister, used as a weekend and holiday home, although the residence has also been used by other senior members of government.

List of first lords (1714–1922)

Much of this list overlaps with the list of prime ministers of the United Kingdom, but there are some notable differences, principally concerning Lord Salisbury, who was prime minister but not first lord in 1885–86, 1887–92 and 1895–1902. Those first lords who were simultaneously prime minister are indicated in bold; those who were considered prime minister only during part of their term are indicated in bold italic.

Thereafter the posts of first lord and prime minister have continually been held by the same person .

See also
 Chief Baron of the Exchequer
 List of Lords Commissioners of the Treasury
 Minister for the Civil Service, by convention also the Prime Minister
 Secretary to the Treasury

Notes

References

Sources

 
 
 

Treasury
Ministerial offices in the United Kingdom
British Prime Minister's Office
1714 establishments in Great Britain